The Barnaul Maniac is the name of an unidentified Russian serial killer who committed the murders of 9 girls and 2 women from 1997 to 2000 in the city of Barnaul and the village of Buranovo. The motives of the perpetrator remain unknown, with the main suspect in the murders having committed suicide in November 2000.

Crimes
On June 7, 1998, an applicant to the Altai State Pedagogical University named Yana Shalamova disappeared. A week later, her body was discovered by fishermen floating in the Ob River. Experts concluded that the girl had been strangled. In the same month, about 10 days after the disappearance of the first girl, another applicant named Galina Derina also went missing. A month later, her body, covered with injuries likely caused by  a sharp object, was found buried in the forest belt near Buranovo. During an inspection of the area, the skeleton of an unidentified girl was recovered. According to authorities, the murder was committed in 1997. In the summer of 1999, another two applicants, this time to the Altai State Technical University, again disappeared from Barnaul. The body of one of them, Svetlana Oprarina from Tuva, was later found in the forest belt of Buranovo.

In the period between June and August 2000, a total of five university entrants disappeared in Barnaul: Yulia Tekhtieva (June 29th), Liliana Wozniuk (July 28th), Olga Shmakova (August 1st), Angela Burdakova (August 8th) and Ksenia Kirgizova (August 15th). All of the girls were last seen at the university. During the preliminary investigation, a total of 35,000 people were interviewed, including teachers, workers, students and university graduates. Several of the applicants said that during the exam period, they met a man who offered help with admissions: aged 40-45, of average build, 175-180 cms. in height, with dark brown, messy hair and overall nice facial features. A composite sketch was drawn, and later shown on local television. According to said sketch, employees at the Altai State Technical University pointed towards one of their fellow colleagues, who was taken in for questioning, but his involvement in the disappearances couldn't be proven. In total, 71 photographs of individuals who offered work applications at the Barnaul universities were compiled, and even car owners who parked in nearby parking lots were checked, but it still didn't lead to an arrest.

In parallel with the investigation, law enforcement agencies uncovered 36 other crimes. In the Altai State Technical University, cases of bribery, as well as sexual harassment by teachers towards students and applicants, were revealed. A number of professors were fired from their jobs upon checking this information. However, at the same time, in July, two women vanished from the city: 53-year-old Valentina Mihaylyukova from the Romanovsky District (on July 14th), and 43-year-old Nina Shakirova from the Krasnoshchyokovsky District (on July 18th).

On September 4th, near the village of Yuzhny, in the forest along the Barnaul-Rubtsovsk Highway, torn clothes, a notebook, a certificate from the State Technical University and a map of the university itself, items which belonged to Kirgizova, were located. While examining the area, investigators uncovered 5 fresh graves in the village cemetery, which the locals didn't recognize. They were opened up, but turned up empty.

In early October, near Buranovo, local residents discovered a skeletonized female corpse. Examinations later established that the remains belonged to Angela Burdakova. In the same month, the remains of Kirgizova, Mihaylyukova, Shakirova and Oprarina were found. In 2001, the remains of Shmakova and Tekhtieva were discovered, on May 17th and September 23rd, respectively, followed by those of Wozniuk the next year.

Psychiatrists tried to recreate the profile of the alleged offender: he was 35-40 years old, married, had children, has a car and his work allows him to take absences for a significant period of time.

Suspects
On September 11, 2000, a student at the Altai State Technical University contacted Barnaul's Internal Affairs Directorate and said that she recognized a man whom she had seen repeatedly during the exam period. They met in the clothing market, with the man introducing himself as a dean from the Faculty of Economics and offering help with admissions. He was identified as 45-year-old Alexander Anisimov, who had previous convictions for hooliganism and theft, and promptly placed on surveillance. Customers from the market described him as a very sociable and helpful person, a married man with three children who owned a VAZ-2109.

On October 27, Anisimov was detained. When a police search was conducted in his apartment and garage, the police located two axes, knives, a shotgun, a hunting rifle, bullets and handcuffs. Initially, he denied ever setting foot on the grounds of Altai State Technical University, but 11 students confirmed that Anisimov had proposed to solve their problems with admissions. Three days later, he wrote down a confession, where he declared his involvement in the disappearance and murders of the five girls who vanished between June and August 2000, with his alleged motive being robbery.

While in jail, Anisimov unsuccessfully tried to hang himself on a jacket cord. On November 1, during an investigative experiment in a 9-storey building on Georgy Isakov Street, in which he was supposed to identify a tenant to whom he had sold the murdered girls' jewels, he jumped out of the 8th-floor window and plunged to his death. After his death, the murders ceased. However, in an interview with the former head of the Police Department of Barnaul, Major General Nikolai Turbovets, conducted on June 11, 2019, he expressed his still-lingering uncertainty concerning whether Anisimov was the culprit.

Aside from Anisimov, other suspects questioned in the June-August disappearances included serial killers Alexey Ryzhkov, who was in prison at the time of the murders and Alexander Pavlenko, as well as the Novosibirsk-based gang of Evgeny Kvashnin.

In the media 
 The programme Independent Investigation (broadcast October 19, 2000 on NTV) covered the crimes in the episode "Barnaul, University Maniac".
 Documentary film Beauties and Monsters (first part) from the series "Criminal Russia".
 Documentary film The Case of the Barnaul Maniac.

See also
 Alexander Pavlenko
 List of fugitives from justice who disappeared
 List of Russian serial killers

References

External links
 He's been killing female abiturs for two years now
Male serial killers
Pages with unreviewed translations
Russian serial killers
Unidentified serial killers
Unsolved murders in Russia